Robert M. Koczera (born November 25, 1953, New Bedford, Massachusetts) is the former member of the Massachusetts House of Representatives for the 11th Bristol district and a former member of the New Bedford City Council (1984–1989)

References

1953 births
Democratic Party members of the Massachusetts House of Representatives
University of Massachusetts Dartmouth alumni
Suffolk University alumni
Providence College alumni
Politicians from New Bedford, Massachusetts
Living people
21st-century American politicians